Herbert Taylor John Ussher  (22 April 1836 – 2 December 1880) was a British colonial administrator who became Governor of the Gold Coast (now Ghana). In private life, he was a keen naturalist and wrote "Notes on the ornithology of the Gold Coast".

He was the son of Thomas Neville Ussher, Consul General of Haiti (and son of Rear-Admiral Sir Thomas Ussher), and his wife Eliza Fawcett. On joining the colonial service he sailed for West Africa in 1864 to become the Private Secretary of the Governor of Lagos. Ussher was subsequently made Collector of Customs in 1866 and then Administrator of the Cape Coast from 1867 to 1872. He was invested a Companion of the Order of St Michael and St George (CMG) in the 1872 Birthday Honours.

He was then appointed Governor of Tobago for 1872–1875 and Governor of Labuan (islands off the coast of Borneo) before returning to be Governor of the Gold Coast from June 1879 until his death in December 1880.

He died in Christiansborg Castle in Accra and was buried in the London Market Cemetery in James Town, Accra. He had married Julie Sarah Hicks née Bond in 1854 and had a daughter, Constance.

Ussher Fort, previously known as Fort Crèvecoeur, was renamed in his honour when the British gained possession of it in 1868.

The Rufous Fishing Owl, (Scotopelia ussheri) was named in his honour by Richard Bowdler Sharpe, after Ussher provided the type specimen to him.

References

|-

|-

1836 births
1880 deaths
British colonial governors and administrators in Africa
Companions of the Order of St Michael and St George
Governors of the Gold Coast (British colony)
British naturalists